Hannington transmitting station is a television and radio transmitting station located on Cottington Hill near the village of Hannington, Hampshire. The transmitter is actually in the parish of Kingsclere. The station provides broadcast services to Berkshire and north Hampshire, and includes a  guyed steel lattice mast.

Hannington's digital broadcasts were severely attenuated to the east before the digital switchover (DSO) so as not to cause co-channel interference with Guildford transmitter. Those restrictions were removed soon after DSO in 2012.

Broadcast interruptions

1977 Ashtar Galactic Command message

On Saturday 26 November 1977 at around 5:10 pm, the Southern ITV broadcast from this transmitter had its UHF sound transmission hi-jacked by unknown agents. At that time Hannington re-broadcast off-air UHF transmissions from Rowridge on the Isle of Wight. The UHF audio signal from Rowridge was swamped by a signal presumably from a location much closer to the Hannington transmitter, overriding the sound of the local ITV station Southern Television and broadcast their own audio message purporting to be from Vrillon, an alien from an institution calling itself the Ashtar Galactic Command. The message, transmitted over an ITN News bulletin and a subsequent Merrie Melodies cartoon, lasted six minutes.

Despite extensive investigations by Hampshire Police, the Independent Broadcasting Authority and Southern Television, those responsible have never been identified, and the potential culprits have ranged from students to university professors to disgruntled television technicians.

1994 World Cup Final
On 17 July 1994 vandals sabotaged the mast's power supply during the 1994 FIFA World Cup Final, meaning that hundreds of thousands of viewers missed about an hour of the match.

Services available

Analogue radio

Digital radio

Digital television

Before switchover

Analogue television
Analogue television transmissions ceased from Hannington during February 2012; BBC2 analogue closed on UHF 45 on 8 February 2012 and all other analogue services closed on 22 February 2012.

Aerial group: E
Polarisation: horizontal

External links
Hannington Transmitter at MB21
Info and pictures of Hannington transmitter including historical power/frequency changes and present co-receivable transmitters
Hannington Transmitter at thebigtower.com

References

Basingstoke and Deane
Transmitter sites in England